The Puerto Mosquito Bioluminescent Bay (Spanish: Bahía bioluminiscente de Puerto Mosquito) or Mosquito Bio Bay, is a bay in the island of Vieques famous for its bioluminescence produced by the dinoflagellate Pyrodinium bahamense, which glows blue when agitated. This species of phytoplankton is found in bays in the Virgin Islands, Puerto Rico and The Bahamas.

History
According to legend, Puerto Mosquito is named after the Mosquito, the name of one of pirate Roberto Cofresí's ships. The bio bay was proclaimed a National Natural Landmark in 1980.

Bioluminescence
Bioluminescence is produced by the dinoflagellate Pyrodinium bahamense, which glows blue when agitated. Although the phytoplankton responsible for the phenomenon of bioluminescence is found throughout the Antilles, Puerto Mosquito is one of the seven year-round bioluminescent bays in the Caribbean. The bioluminescence is the product of a number of factors: the water conditions and ecosystem created by the surrounding mangrove forest (mostly Rhizophora mangle), the complete lack of modern development in the lagoon, the temperature of the water and the depth of the bay.

Recreation
The bright blue hues produced by the microorganisms during nights of very little moonlight or new moon attracts tourists to the bio bay. It is one of the three bio bays in Puerto Rico; the other two are Laguna Grande in Fajardo and La Parguera in Lajas. The bay and its surrounding mangrove forest are protected by the Vieques Bioluminescent Bay Natural Reserve and no swimming is allowed. Guided tours allow visitors to kayak in the bay and observe the bioluminescence. The bio bay is located near the beach community of Esperanza, between the barrios of Puerto Ferro and Puerto Real in Vieques, Puerto Rico.

Gallery

See also
List of National Natural Landmarks in Puerto Rico

References

External links
Bahía Mosquito "Bahía Bioluminiscente", Vieques, Puerto Rico (Spanish)
Mosquito Bioluminescent Bay|Vieques (English)

IUCN Category III
Vieques, Puerto Rico
National Natural Landmarks in Puerto Rico
Bays of Puerto Rico
Tourist attractions in Puerto Rico
Bioluminescence
1980 establishments in Puerto Rico
Protected areas established in 1980